P. Vishnuvardhan Reddy (born 8 February 1981) is a former Member of Legislative Assembly (M.L.A.) in which he represented the Jubilee Hills constituency, of Telangana. He was born in Hyderabad, India to former Indian National Congress party MLA, P. Janardhan Reddy and Sulochana. His first election was followed by the death of his father from Khairatabad constituency before delimitation. He won with a majority of 2,80,236 votes, and he has since been re-elected for the newly formed constituency of Jubilee Hills.

He lost election in 2018 with many less votes.

References

Members of the Andhra Pradesh Legislative Assembly
Living people
1981 births
Indian National Congress politicians from Andhra Pradesh